See also Boswell (surname) 
Buswell is a surname. Notable people with the surname include: 

Blair Buswell (born 1956), American artist 
Charles Albert Buswell (1913–2008), American bishop 
Dianne Buswell (born 1989), Australian dancer
Henry Buswell (1839-1940), English Anglican priest
J. Oliver Buswell (1895–1977), American churchman, educator, president of Wheaton College (Illinois)
Neville Buswell (1943–2019), British actor 
Shaun Buswell (born 1976), British musician
Troy Buswell (born 1966), Australian politician 
Walter Buswell (1907–1991), Canadian ice hockey player